Jan Douglas Bergqvist (born 29 March 1993) is a Swedish professional footballer who plays as a centre-back for Latvian Higher League club Riga.

Career
Born in Stockholm, Bergqvist moved with his family to England when he was seven years old. He played youth football with Reading and Queens Park Rangers, before joining Aldershot Town in 2009. Bergqvist eventually became youth team captain at Aldershot, and spent loan spells at both Thatcham Town and Dorchester Town, before making his senior debut for Aldershot in May 2011. He joined Farnborough on loan in August 2011, and Basingstoke Town in October 2012.

Bergqvist signed for Exeter City in June 2013, before moving on loan to Welling United a few days later, for the whole of the 2013–14 season.

On 10 February 2014, Bergqvist left England to return to Sweden, signing a two-year contract with Östersund on a free transfer. He did so as part of a scheme called 'League Football Education' which aims to obtain contracts abroad for players in the English league system, alongside Andrew Mills and Jamie Hopcutt.

On 27 March 2019, Bergqvist joined Eliteserien side Haugesund on loan until 31 July with an option to make the deal permanent.

In February 2020 he moved to Polish club Arka Gdynia.

After playing in Sweden with Kalmar FF, he signed for Ukrainian club Chornomorets Odesa in January 2022. He returned to Kalmar FF on loan in March due to 2022 Russian invasion of Ukraine. After the loan spell ended he moved to Latvian club Riga FC.

Career statistics

References

External links 
 

1993 births
Living people
Swedish footballers
Swedish expatriate footballers
Association football central defenders
Reading F.C. players
Queens Park Rangers F.C. players
Aldershot Town F.C. players
Thatcham Town F.C. players
Dorchester Town F.C. players
Farnborough F.C. players
Basingstoke Town F.C. players
Staines Town F.C. players
Welling United F.C. players
English Football League players
Exeter City F.C. players
Östersunds FK players
FK Haugesund players
Arka Gdynia players
Kalmar FF players
Riga FC players
Allsvenskan players
Superettan players
Eliteserien players
Ekstraklasa players
Swedish expatriate sportspeople in Poland
Swedish expatriate sportspeople in Norway
Swedish expatriate sportspeople in England
Swedish expatriate sportspeople in Ukraine
Swedish expatriate sportspeople in Latvia
Expatriate footballers in Poland
Expatriate footballers in Norway
Expatriate footballers in England
Expatriate footballers in Ukraine
Expatriate footballers in Latvia
Footballers from Stockholm
FC Chornomorets Odesa players